The Communist Party of Turkmenistan was the ruling communist party of the Turkmen SSR, and a part of the Communist Party of the Soviet Union. From 1985 it was led by Saparmurat Niyazov. 16 December 1991, as the Soviet Union was in the process of dissolving, Niyazov reorganized the CPT as the Democratic Party of Turkmenistan. The current Communist Party of Turkmenistan was made illegal during the presidency of Niyazov after independence and remains banned.

Leadership

First Secretaries

Second Secretaries

See also
Politics of Turkmenistan
Communist Party of the Soviet Union

References 

Communist parties in the Soviet Union
1924 establishments in the Soviet Union
1991 disestablishments in the Soviet Union
Banned communist parties
Political parties in Turkmenistan
Turkmenistan
Turkmenistan
Communism in Turkmenistan
Turkmenistan
Political parties established in 1921
Parties of one-party systems
Political parties disestablished in 1991
Turkmen Soviet Socialist Republic